Chriswill Bradley September (born ) is a South African rugby union player for  in the Currie Cup and the Rugby Challenge. His regular position is scrum-half.

References

South African rugby union players
Living people
1994 births
People from Worcester, South Africa
Rugby union scrum-halves
Griquas (rugby union) players
Leopards (rugby union) players
Pumas (Currie Cup) players
Rugby union players from Worcester, South Africa